Living Dub Volume 1 is a studio album by reggae artist Burning Spear. It is a dub mix of the 1978 album Social Living.

Originally released on vinyl in 1979, the album's first CD issue came in 1991 on a Jamaican release by Dee Jay Records and featured the same mix as the 1979 album. The second CD release came in 1993 on Heartbeat Records, but this time featured a completely new remix created specially for the CD.

The original 1979 mix was restored to CD in 2002 as Original Living Dub Vol. 1, on Burning Music. Both mixes credit Winston Rodney (Burning Spear) with production. The 1979 mix was created by Sylvan Morris, the 1993 mix by Barry O'Hare.

Critical reception
The Virgin Encyclopedia of Seventies Music called the album "excellent."

Track listing
Children of Today
Present
Associate
Jah Boto
In Those Days
Run Come Dub
Help Us
Musiya
All Over
Hill Street Dub (Heartbeat release only)

References

Burning Spear albums
1979 albums
Dub albums